The 1979 Irish Masters was the fifth edition of the professional invitational snooker tournament, which took place from 1 to 3 February 1979. The tournament was played at Goffs in Kill, County Kildare, and featured four professional players.

Doug Mountjoy won the title for the first time, beating Ray Reardon 6–5 in the final.

Main draw

References

Irish Masters
Irish Masters
Irish Masters
Irish Masters